(also Sat-cit-ananda or ) is an epithet and description for the subjective experience of the ultimate unchanging reality, called Brahman, in certain branches of Hindu philosophy, especially Vedanta. It represents "existence, consciousness, and bliss" or "truth, consciousness, bliss".

Etymology
 is a compounded Sanskrit word consisting of "sat", "chit", and "ananda", all three considered as inseparable from the nature of ultimate reality called Brahman in Hinduism. The different forms of spelling is driven by euphonic (sandhi) rules of Sanskrit, useful in different contexts.

 sat: In Sanskrit, sat means "being, existence", "real, actual", "true, good, right", or "that which really is, existence, essence, true being, really existent, good, true". 
 cit: means "consciousness" or "spirit".
 ānanda: means "happiness, joy, bliss", "pure happiness, one of three attributes of Atman or Brahman in the Vedanta philosophy". Loctefeld and other scholars translate ananda as "bliss".

 is therefore translated as "truth consciousness bliss", "reality consciousness bliss", or "Existence Consciousness Bliss".

Discussion
The term is contextually related to "the ultimate reality" in various schools of Hindu traditions. In theistic traditions,  is same as God such as Vishnu, Shiva or Goddess in Shakti traditions. A Jiva is instructed to identify themselves with the Atman, which is the Brahman in a being, thus the purpose of human birth is to realize "I am Brahman" (Aham Brahmasmi) through Prajna which leads to the state of "ultimate consciousness" referred as sat-chit-ananda and subsequently Moksha, however as long as a being identifies with Maya which is finite, material and tangible, they will continue to gather Karma and remain in Saṃsāra.  or Brahman is held to be the source of all reality, source of all conscious thought, and source of all perfection-bliss. It is the ultimate, the complete, the destination of spiritual pursuit in Hinduism.

Textual references
The Brihadaranyaka Upanishad is among the earliest Hindu texts which links and then discusses Atman (Self), Brahman (ultimate reality), awareness, joy and bliss such as in sections 2.4, 3.9 and 4.3. The Chandogya Upanishad, in section 3.14 to 3.18, discusses Atman and Brahman, these being identical to "that which shines and glows both inside and outside", "dear", "pure knowing, awareness", "one's innermost being", "highest light", "luminous". Other 1st-millennium BCE texts, such as the Taittiriya Upanishad in section 2.1, as well as minor Upanishads, discuss Atman and Brahman in saccidananda-related terminology.

An early mention of the compound word  is in verse 3.11 of Tejobindu Upanishad, composed before the 4th-century CE.

Vedanta philosophy 

The Vedantic philosophy understands  as a synonym of the three fundamental attributes of Brahman. In Advaita Vedanta, states Werner, it is the sublimely blissful experience of the boundless, pure consciousness and represents the unity of spiritual essence of ultimate reality.

 is an epithet for Brahman, considered indescribable, unitary, ultimate, unchanging reality in Hinduism.

Vaishnava philosophy

See also

Notes

References

Bibliography
 
 
 
 
 
 
 
Hindu philosophical concepts
Kashmir Shaivism
Advaita Vedanta
Advaita Shaivism
Nondualism
Sanskrit words and phrases